The Bishop of The Murray is the diocesan bishop of the Anglican Diocese of The Murray, Australia.

List of Bishops of The Murray
References

External links
 – official site

 
Lists of Anglican bishops and archbishops
Anglican bishops of The Murray